The 2018 bwin World Series of Darts Finals was the fourth staging of the World Series of Darts Finals tournament, organised by the Professional Darts Corporation. The tournament took place in the Multiversum Schwechat, Vienna, Austria, from 2–4 November 2018. It featured a field of 24 players.

Michael van Gerwen was three-time defending champion after defeating Gary Anderson 11-6 in the 2017 final, but lost in the quarter-finals to Raymond van Barneveld 8–10. This ended a 13-match unbeaten streak and 3 year reign as champion.

James Wade won his first World Series Finals title. It was his second title in as many weeks after he beat Michael Smith 11–10 in a dramatic final, in which Wade missed two match darts in the penultimate leg and Smith missed five match darts in the final leg.

Prize money
The total prize money remained £250,000.

Qualification
The top eight players from the six World Series events of 2018 are seeded for this tournament. Those events are:

2018 German Darts Masters
2018 US Darts Masters
2018 Shanghai Darts Masters
2018 Auckland Darts Masters
2018 Melbourne Darts Masters
2018 Brisbane Darts Masters

In addition, the next four highest ranked players from the PDC Order of Merit following the 2018 World Grand Prix final on 6 October 2018 qualify, as will the next eight players on the World Series Order of Merit. Another four places were awarded following a Tour Card Holders' qualifier in Barnsley on 19 October.

Corey Cadby originally qualified through the World Series Order of Merit, but withdrew following a broken arm in a car accident. Royden Lam replaced him. Dawson Murschell also originally qualified through the World Series Order of Merit, but withdrew on the day of the tournament with illness. Max Hopp replaced Murschell as the highest player from the Order of Merit who had not qualified and was able to play, with Mark McGrath, Tim Pusey and Haupai Puha unable to make the journey at such short notice.

The following players qualified for the tournament:

Draw

References

World Series of Darts
World Series of Darts
+2018
World Series of Darts Finals